Yoon-il Auh (born March 3, 1961) is a Korean–American educator, violinist and composer.

Professional background 

Yoon-il is a professor at Kyung Hee Cyber University in Seoul Korea, Department of Computer Information Communications Engineering. He is recognized as the lead designer of a project MOOC 2.0 and South Korea's Military MOOC (M-MOOC) 

Yoon-il Auh served as the vice president of Kyung Hee Cyber University and prior to an academic position in Korea, he was the vice president of the National Labor College of the AFL–CIO (2005-2012). He also served as a director at Central Michigan University, where he was responsible for distance and distributed education from 2001 to 2005. Auh served as Director of Research at the Music for One Foundation (INGO) at the Research Institute for Humanities Performing Arts since 2011. From 2013 ~ 2015, Auh was a Visiting Professor at Global Education Cooperation Program, Interdisciplinary Studies, College of Education at Seoul National University and served as Vice Chair of the South Korean Ministry of Education's Special Committee of the Future of Korean Education in 2015.

Auh received a Doctor of Education (Ed.D.) in instructional technology from Teachers College, Columbia University. His doctoral dissertation, "Designing and Creating an Interdisciplinary Learning Environment Using Cognitive Flexibility Theory", received the College President's Doctoral Dissertation Award in 2000. Prior to that, Auh received his MA in Cognition, Computing and Education and an Ed.M. in Music Education and Cognition from Columbia University and an MM and B.A from the Juilliard School. He is also an American Council on Education-certified curriculum reviewer.

Music background 
In addition to his academic career, Auh has been an active violinist, conductor, composer  and author of music books.  He received musical training from the Juilliard School under Dorothy DeLay for fourteen years. As a concert violinist, he has performed at American concert venues including Avery Fisher Hall, Alice Tully Hall in the Lincoln Center, and Carnegie Hall, where he gave his New York debut at the age of sixteen. He is also the founder of the International Web Concert Hall (IWCH) competition, which was launched in 1998 and continued until 2012. IWCH was the first of its kind in classical music to hold such events at a global level. The IWCH was reviewed in The New York Times  He is actively involved in promoting community development via performing arts education at both a local and global level.  At the global level, he has presented on the topics of performing arts education, community development through arts, lifelong learning, and online learning Paraguay apunta a mejorar la educación con ayuda de la tecnología. He is also an author of Harmony Nation Education System sponsored by Kyobo Life and Music for One Foundation. The Harmony Nation program and related activity has been sponsored by KOICA since 2013 and has been utilized for promoting education for development in South Korea,  Myanmar, Tanzania, Cambodia, Panama, and Costa Rica. From 2012–2015, Auh served as a faculty member in the Global Leaders program at YOA Orchestra of the Americas an organization based in Washington, D.C.

References

External links
  Understanding Global Higher Education: Insights from Key Global Publications edited by Georgiana Mihut, Philip G. Altbach, Hans de Wit
 The Evolution and Evaluation of Massive Open Online Courses: MOOCs in Motion By Leonard J. Waks
 Fnnews.com
 Biz.chosun.com
 Etnews.com
 MOOC 2.0-Etnews
 ISSUE MAKER MAGAZINE

1961 births
Living people
American educators of Asian descent
American musicians of Korean descent
Juilliard School alumni
Teachers College, Columbia University alumni